Dinesh Kumar Dhakal (born 5 May 1996) is a Bhutanese male track and field athlete who competes in the 100 metres. He was his country's sole representative at the 2019 World Athletics Championships, where he competed in the preliminary round of the 100 m and recorded a Bhutanese record of 11.64 seconds.

International competitions

References

External links

1996 births
Living people
Bhutanese male sprinters
World Athletics Championships athletes for Bhutan